The northern pearl dace (Margariscus nachtriebi) is a freshwater ray-finned fish in the family Cyprinidae, the carps and minnows. It occurs in Atlantic, Hudson Bay, Great Lakes, and Mississippi River basins in the northern United States and  Canada. Its preferred habitat is cool, clear headwater streams, bog drainage streams, ponds and small lakes, and in stained, peaty waters of beaver ponds, usually over sand or gravel.

References

Margariscus
Freshwater fish of North America
Fish described in 1896